Gould Bay is a bay located at the junction of the Filchner Ice Shelf with the northeast corner of Berkner Island, in the southern Weddell Sea. It was discovered by the Ronne Antarctic Research Expedition, 1947–48, under the leadership of Commander Finn Ronne, U.S. Navy Reserve, who named this bay for Laurence M. Gould, geologist, geographer, and second in command of the Byrd Antarctic Expedition, 1928–30.

See also
 List of Antarctic field camps

References

Bays of Antarctica
Berkner Island